Elisabeth Blunschy (13 July 1922 – 1 May 2015) was a Swiss politician. She served as the first woman President of the National Council of Switzerland and was one of the first women elected to the National Council of Switzerland.

Biography
Elisabeth Blunschy was born on 13 July 1922 in Schwyz. Her father, Hans Steiner, was a politician who served as a federal judge and a member of the National Council. She was raised in Lausanne and attended high school in Fribourg. She then studied law at the University of Lausanne and the University of Fribourg. She became the first women in her canton to be admitted to the bar. After her studies, she worked as a lawyer for several years. She became president of the Swiss Catholic Women's Association and then Caritas Switzerland, a social justice organization.

In 1971, she won a seat in the National Council. Although women won the right to vote in federal elections earlier that year, her home Canton of Schwyz voted against women’s suffrage and did not give women the right to vote in cantonal elections until 1972.

In May 1977, Hans Wyer, the incumbent National Council President, resigned after winning election to the Council of State of Valais. Blunschy was elected to serve out his term, becoming the first woman to serve as president of that body. The term as president lasted only seven months, after which she return to regular service in the council.

After the 1987 Swiss federal election, Blunschy left office and did not remain active in politics.

Personal life
She was married to Alfred Blunschy and had three children. Alfred died in 1972.

Elisabeth Blunschy died on 1 May 2015 at the age of 92.

References

External links
Official page at Parliament of Switzerland website

1922 births
2015 deaths
Members of the National Council (Switzerland)
Presidents of the National Council (Switzerland)
Women members of the National Council (Switzerland)
People from the canton of Schwyz
Christian Democratic People's Party of Switzerland politicians
20th-century Swiss women politicians
20th-century Swiss politicians